The 2017–18 Bangalore Super Division was the fifteenth season of the Bangalore Super Division which is the third tier of the Indian association football system and the top tier of the Karnataka football system. The season started on 10 November 2017. Madras Engineering Group (MEG) were the defending champions. Bangalore Independents and Jawahar Union were promoted from 'A' Division, whereas a new team FC Deccan was a direct entry team. AGORC and DYES teams were relegated to 'A' Division. Bengaluru FC fielded their newly launched reserve team, Bengaluru FC 'B'. All games were played at Bangalore Football Stadium.

Ozone F.C. won their second title, winning all ten games, whereas RWF and FC Deccan were relegated to 'A' division.

Teams

Table

Results

References

Bangalore Super Division seasons
4